Orlando Alberto Paredes Lara (born 3 August 1940) is a Mexican lawyer and politician affiliated with the Institutional Revolutionary Party. He served as Senator of the LVIII and LIX Legislatures of the Mexican Congress representing Yucatán and as Deputy of the LVII Legislature.

References

1940 births
Living people
Politicians from Yucatán (state)
People from Mérida, Yucatán
Members of the Senate of the Republic (Mexico)
Members of the Chamber of Deputies (Mexico)
Institutional Revolutionary Party politicians
20th-century Mexican politicians
21st-century Mexican politicians
Members of the Congress of Yucatán
20th-century Mexican lawyers